Tanyka Renee (born January 18, 1986) is an American health and fitness journalist, author, Playboy model, former pro-athlete, and holistic nutritionist.

Career
Renee has appeared on television, in magazines and in videos. Her credits include Playboy, Rachael Ray, Fox News and JET.

Renee is the founding owner of D2B Holistic, a company producing a line of organic natural products. Rennee is also the owner of SuddenlyAmazingYou.com and creator of The Suddenly Slim Waist System.

In between modeling assignments, Renee was an active and talented participant in sports such as basketball, soccer, softball, and track and field. Renee played with the LFL as defensive and offensive lineman for the NY Majesty and The Philadelphia Passion. She was a featured cast member on MTV's Lingerie Football. Complex Magazine named Renee #3 of the 10 Hottest Women of the 2011 Lingerie Football League Finals. In 2012, the Bleacher Report named Renee one of the 50 Prettiest Faces in Sports.

Renee currently serves as the Deputy Editor for Bombshell by Bleu. In the past, she was a contributing writer for Heart and Soul and Jones Magazine. Her first book, "The Complete Guide to a Sexier Backside," was published in early 2015.

References

External links 

 Philadelphia Daily News Dan Gross: Tanyka Renee: Her Passion is football
 Philadelphia Metro Passion, LFL heating up newsstands this month    
 http://www.philly.com/philly/sports/blogs/Playoffs_and_Playboy_for_Passions_Renee.html
 Complex Magazine                     
 NY Post
 BDB Article 
 XXL Magazine Article 
 PYNK Magazine Article 
 Rachael Ray Article 

1986 births
Living people
People from New Britain, Connecticut
African-American female models
American women bloggers
American bloggers
Female travelers
21st-century American women
21st-century African-American women writers
21st-century American women writers
21st-century African-American writers
20th-century African-American people
20th-century African-American women